Ministry of Information and Communication Technology or Communications Technology may refer to:
Ministry of Information and Communications Technology (Colombia)
Ministry of Information, Communications & Technology (Eswatini)
Ministry of Information and Communications Technology (Iran)
Ministry of Information and Communications Technology (Jordan)
Ministry of Information and Communication Technology (Namibia)
Ministry of Information and Communication Technology (Sri Lanka)
Ministry of Information and Communication Technology (Thailand)
Ministry of Information and Communications Technology (Zimbabwe)

See also
Ministry of Information (disambiguation)